The Real Thing: In Performance (1964–1981) is an anthology of performances by Marvin Gaye. It was produced by Reelin' in the Years Productions and the Universal Music Group International. It includes a 24-page booklet with an extensive essay by Grammy Award-winning writer, Rob Bowman.

Track listing

Main tracks
"Hitch Hike" (from American Bandstand – December 13, 1964)
"Pride and Joy" (from Shivaree – December 4, 1965)
"Can I Get a Witness" (from Hollywood A Go-Go – November 27, 1965)
"Pretty Little Baby" (from Swingin' Time – December 15, 1965)
"Ain't That Peculiar" (from Swingin' Time – December 15, 1965)
"You're a Wonderful One" (from The New Lloyd Thaxton Show – November 18, 1965)
"Ain't No Mountain High Enough" (with Tammi Terrell) (from Swingin' Sounds of Expo '67 – 1967)
"I Heard It Through the Grapevine" (from The Hollywood Palace – January 7, 1969) 
"What's Going On" (from Save the Children – September 27, 1972)
"What's Happening Brother" (from Save The Children – September 27, 1972)
"Come Get to This" (from Zomerhappening – July 4, 1981)
"Let's Get It On" (from Zomerhappening – July 4, 1981)
"Distant Lover" (from Dinah and Friends – October 10, 1979)
"A Funky Space Reincarnation" (promotional film)
"Ego Tripping Out" (from Dinah and Friends – October 10, 1979)
"Heavy Love Affair" (from Follies – May 7, 1981)

All tracks have been remastered for this release.

Personnel 
Marvin Gaye

References 

Marvin Gaye video albums
2006 live albums
2006 video albums
Live video albums